Mumbhar is a village in the Punjab province of Pakistan. It is located at 31°2'45N 73°20'40E with an altitude of 163 metres (538 feet).

References

Villages in Punjab, Pakistan